In the 2012–13 season, Mladost Mrkonjić Grad will compete in the Basketball Championship of Bosnia and Herzegovina, BiH Cup, and RS Cup.

Current roster

Depth chart

Roster changes

In

Out

Statistics

Liga 12

Competitions

Basketball League of Serbia

Standings

Pld - Played; W - Won; L - Lost; PF - Points for; PA - Points against; Diff - Difference; Pts - Points.

Matches

References

KK Mladost Mrkonjić Grad